Karnataka State Highway 57, commonly referred to as KA SH 57, is a normal state highway that runs north through many districts in the state of Karnataka.  This state highway touches numerous cities and villages Viz.Shimoga, Chikmagalur, Hassan and K R Nagar. The total length of the highway is 662 km.

Route description 
The route followed by this highway is Bagalakote – Badami – Ron – Huyalgola – Gadag – Sirahatti – Ranibennur – Sikaripura – Shimoga – Lakkavalli – Tharikere – Chikamagalur – Belur – Hassan – Holenarasipura – K R Nagar – Nanjangud  – Beligeriranganabetta

Highway connecting Bagalakote – Badami – Ron – Huyalgola – Gadag – Sirahatti – Guttal – Ranibennur -
Masur – Sikaripura – Shimoga – Lakkavalli – Tharikere – Chikamagalur – Belur – Hassan – Holenarasipura – K R Nagar – Belikere – Nanjangud – Yalandur- Beligeriranganabetta. Total 662 kilometres approx.

Many villages, cities and towns in various districts are connected by this state highway.

History

Major junctions 

Bagalakote – Badami – Gadag – Ranibennur – Shikaripura – Shivamogga – Tarikere – Chikamagalur – Belur – Hassan – Holenarasipura – K R Nagar – Bilikere - Hampapura - Nanjangud  – Biligiriranga Hills

References

See also 
 List of State Highways in Karnataka

State Highways in Karnataka
Roads in Shimoga district
Roads in Chikkamagaluru district
Roads in Hassan district
Roads in Mysore district